"Jody" is a song by American singer Jermaine Stewart, released in 1986 as the third single from his album Frantic Romantic. It was written by Stewart, Narada Michael Walden and Jeffrey Cohen, and produced by Walden.

In America, the single became Stewart's most successful single on the dance charts, peaking at #9, and became his third single to enter the Billboard Hot 100, peaking at #42. In Canada, the single made a brief appearance on the chart, peaking at #81.

Background
"Jody" was inspired by Jody Watley of American music group Shalamar, for which Stewart had been a backing vocalist and dancer in the early 1980s.

Watley went on to co-write two singles on Stewart's 1988 follow-up album, Say It Again: "Don't Talk Dirty to Me" and "Is It Really Love?," both of them with her husband of the time André Cymone, who co-produced and performed on the album.

Release information
The B-side for the single, "Dance Floor", was also taken from the album Frantic Romantic. It was written by Stewart and Roy Carter. For the single, various remixes of "Jody" were released along with a limited edition 2x12" vinyl that included two remixes of "We Don't Have to Take Our Clothes Off".

Formats
7" Single
"Jody" - 3:40
"Dance Floor" - 4:43

12" Single (American/Canadian release)
"Jody (Dance Mix)" - 5:33
"Jody (Dub Mix)" - 6:09
"Dance Floor (Extended Version)" - 6:38
"Jody (Single Version)" - 3:40

12" Single (European release)
"Jody (Dance Version)" - 5:24
"Jody (Dub Version)" - 5:56
"Dance Floor" - 4:44

Limited Edition 2x12" Single
"Jody (Dance Version)" - 5:24
"Dance Floor" - 4:44
"We Don't Have To Take Our Clothes Off (Remixed Version)" - 5:45
"We Don't Have To Take Our Clothes Off (Remixed Dub Version)" - 6:40

Chart performance

Personnel
 Producer on "Jody" - Narada Michael Walden
 Producer on "Dance Floor" - John "Jellybean" Benitez
 Remixer on "Jody (Dance Mix)" - Arthur Baker
 Remix Engineer on "Jody (Dance Mix)" - Alan Meyerson
 Editor on "Jody (Dance Mix)" - Benji Candelario
 Remixer on "Jody (Dub Mix)" - Arthur Baker
 Remix Engineer on "Jody (Dub Mix)" - Alan Meyerson
 Editor on "Jody (Dub Mix)" - Benji Candelario
 Producer on "Dance Floor (Extended Version)" - John "Jellybean" Benitez
 Editor on "Dance Floor (Extended Version)" - Chep Nunez
 Remixer on "We Don't Have to Take Our Clothes Off" - Lewis A. Martineé
 Writers of "Jody" - Jermaine Stewart, Narada Michael Walden, Jeffrey Cohen
 Writers of "Dance Floor" - Jermaine Stewart, Roy Carter
 Writers of "We Don't Have to Take Our Clothes Off" - Narada Michael Walden, Preston Glass

References

1986 singles
Jermaine Stewart songs
Songs written by Narada Michael Walden
Song recordings produced by Narada Michael Walden
1986 songs
Songs written by Jermaine Stewart